Hockomock Bay, located in Sagadahoc County, Maine, is a small brackish water bay connected to Montsweag Bay. It is located in the area of Wiscasset, and Bath, Maine. The Chewonki Foundation is near Hockomock Bay.

Notable residence
 Robert L. Dale

Further reading 
Hockomock Bay at Google Maps
Landscope America

References 

Bays of Maine
Bodies of water of Lincoln County, Maine